Aliflurane (code name Hoechst Compound 26 or 26-P) is a halocarbon drug which was investigated as an inhalational anesthetic but was never marketed.

See also
 Halopropane
 Norflurane
 Roflurane
 Synthane
 Teflurane

References

General anesthetics
Cyclopropanes
Ethers
Organochlorides
Organofluorides
GABAA receptor positive allosteric modulators
Fluranes